Michael Barton may refer to:

 Michael Barton (cricketer) (1914–2006), English cricketer
 Michael Barton (biologist), American ichthyologist
 Mike Polchlopek (born 1963), American wrestler with the ring name Mike Barton